O'Fallon may refer to:

People
 James O'Fallon (bef 1756–1786), Irish Roman Catholic clergyman
 John O'Fallon (1786–1865), American businessman, philanthropist, and military officer
 Peter O'Fallon, American television director

Places
 O'Fallon, Illinois, United States
 O'Fallon Township, St. Clair County, Illinois, United States
 O'Fallon, Missouri, United States
 O'Fallon Park
 O'Fallon, St. Louis, a neighborhood in the city of St. Louis, Missouri, United States
 O'Fallon Street (St. Louis)

See also
 O'Fallons, Nebraska, United States
 Fallon (disambiguation)